Liotella elegans is a species of sea snail, a marine gastropod mollusk in the family Skeneidae,.

Distribution
This marine species occurs off the Northern Territory, Australia.

References

 Laseron, C. 1958. Liotiidae and allied molluscs from the Dampierian Zoogeographical Province. Rec. Aust. Mus. Vol. 24 (11) pp. 165–182, figs 1-87

External links
 World Register of Marine Species

elegans
Gastropods described in 1958